Scovel Richardson (February 4, 1912 – March 30, 1982) was a judge of the United States Customs Court and the United States Court of International Trade.

Education and career

Born on February 4, 1912, in Nashville, Tennessee, Richardson received an Artium Baccalaureus degree in 1934 from the University of Illinois at Urbana–Champaign and an Artium Magister degree in 1936 from the same institution. He received a Juris Doctor in 1937 from the Howard University School of Law. Richardson entered private practice in Chicago, Illinois, from 1938 to 1939. He was an associate professor of law at Lincoln University School of Law from 1939 to 1943. He served as a senior attorney at the Office of Price Administration from 1943 to 1944. He served as dean and professor of law at Lincoln University School of Law from 1944 to 1953. He served as a member of the United States Board of Parole from 1953 to 1957 and served as chair of the United States Board of Parole from 1954 to 1957.

Federal judicial service

Richardson was nominated by President Dwight D. Eisenhower on March 4, 1957, to a seat on the United States Customs Court vacated by Judge William A. Ekwall. He was confirmed by the United States Senate on April 4, 1957, and received his commission on April 8, 1957. Richardson was reassigned by operation of law to the United States Court of International Trade on November 1, 1980, to a new seat authorized by 94 Stat. 1727. His service terminated on March 30, 1982, due to his death in New Rochelle, New York. He was succeeded by Judge Gregory W. Carman.

See also 
 List of African-American federal judges
 List of African-American jurists

References

Sources
 

1912 births
1982 deaths
Judges of the United States Court of International Trade
University of Illinois alumni
Howard University School of Law alumni
People from Nashville, Tennessee
Judges of the United States Customs Court
20th-century American judges
United States federal judges appointed by Dwight D. Eisenhower